Elena Albertina Iparraguirre Revoredo (born 14 September 1947), also known as Comrade Míriam, is a high-ranking member of the Peruvian Maoist revolutionary party Sendero Luminoso (Shining Path). 

Iparraguirre, a major female figure in the Shining Path, became the second-in-command, as well as Abimael Guzmán's lover and wife after first wife Augusta la Torre's death in 1988. 

Iparraguirre was captured in Lima in 1992 along with her partner, Shining Path founder Abimael Guzmán. In 1992, she received a sentence of life imprisonment by a secret military tribunal. She was awarded a new trial in a civilian court in 2004, but the proceeding ended as a mistrial. After a third trial in 2006, both Iparraguirre and Guzmán again received life sentences. 

In 2010, Iparraguirre and Guzmán were married.

References

Anti-revisionists
Living people
Peruvian communists
Peruvian revolutionaries
People convicted on terrorism charges
People imprisoned on charges of terrorism
Members of the Shining Path
Peruvian prisoners sentenced to life imprisonment
Prisoners sentenced to life imprisonment by Peru
1947 births
Women in war in South America
Women in warfare post-1945